Suli Daraq (also Romanized as Sūlī Daraq) is a village in Abish Ahmad Rural District, Abish Ahmad District, Kaleybar County, East Azerbaijan Province, Iran. At the 2006 census, its population was 74, in 16 families.

References 

Populated places in Kaleybar County